Jeong Hae-rim  (born 16 December 1995) is a South Korean snowboarder.
 
She competed in the 2013, 2015 and 2017 FIS Snowboard World Championships, and in the 2018 Winter Olympics, in parallel giant slalom.

References

External links

1995 births
Living people
South Korean female snowboarders
Olympic snowboarders of South Korea
Snowboarders at the 2018 Winter Olympics
Snowboarders at the 2022 Winter Olympics
Snowboarders at the 2017 Asian Winter Games
Universiade gold medalists for South Korea
Universiade bronze medalists for South Korea
Universiade medalists in snowboarding
Competitors at the 2019 Winter Universiade
People from Suwon
Sportspeople from Gyeonggi Province
21st-century South Korean women